The 75th Assembly District of Wisconsin is one of 99 districts in the Wisconsin State Assembly.  Located in northwestern Wisconsin, the district comprises all of Barron County and the southern half of Washburn County.  It contains the cities of Barron, Chetek, Cumberland, Rice Lake, Shell Lake, and Spooner.  The district is represented by Republican David Armstrong, since January 2021.

The 75th Assembly District is located within Wisconsin's 25th Senate district, along with the 73rd and 74th Assembly districts.  The district is located almost entirely within Wisconsin's 7th congressional district, with the exception of the portion in Dunn County, which falls within Wisconsin's 3rd congressional district.

List of past representatives

References 

Wisconsin State Assembly districts
Barron County, Wisconsin
Burnett County, Wisconsin
Dunn County, Wisconsin
Polk County, Wisconsin
St. Croix County, Wisconsin
Washburn County, Wisconsin